Cenizate is a municipality in Albacete, Castile-La Mancha, Spain. It has a population of 1,143. The former professional cyclist Roque de la Cruz was born here.

See also
Church of Nuestra Señora de las Nieves (Cenizate)

References

Municipalities of the Province of Albacete